Boogie (sometimes called post-disco and electro-funk) is a rhythm and blues genre of electronic dance music with close ties to the post-disco style, that first emerged in the United States during the late 1970s to mid-1980s. The sound of boogie is defined by bridging acoustic and electronic musical instruments with emphasis on vocals and miscellaneous effects. It later evolved into electro and house music.

Characteristics
Boogie, following the example of post-disco, generally lacks the four-on-the-floor beat, the "traditional" rhythm of disco music; instead has a strong accent on the second and fourth beats, and tempo generally in the 110 to 116 beats-per-minute range. Aside from applying certain technological and promotional aspects of new wave music and having been fairly exposed to its subgenre synthpop, boogie is, however, R&B-rooted and predominantly draws from funk music. Other influences from a completely different music landscape include jazz. Typical boogie track can be characterized by mid-tempo rhythm, prominent use of slap bass (electric—in the early 1980s—and/or synthetic—mid-1980s onwards), loud clapping sound, melodic chords and, obviously, synthesizers.

The term, coined by British DJs Norman Jay and Dez Parkes, had been used on eBay to refer a specific form of early-1980s dance music of African-American origin.

History

1920s–1930s: etymology
The first documented use of the word boogie is dated back to 1929. Boogie, as defined by Merriam-Webster Dictionary, is an occasion for dancing to the strongly rhythmic rock music that encourages people to dance. Earliest association of the word boogie was with blues and later rock and roll and rockabilly genres.

1970s–1980s: current meaning

In the 1970s, the term was revitalized for disco and later post-disco subcultures. The term "boogie" was used in London to describe a form of African-American dance/funk music from the 1980s. The name boogie tended to be used as, although essentially used to describe disco records, the word disco had gained bad connotations by the early 1980s. Originally the word boogie could be found in 1970s funk and disco records, most notably "Boogie Nights" by Heatwave, "Blame It on the Boogie" by The Jacksons, "Boogie Oogie Oogie" by A Taste of Honey and "Boogie Wonderland" by Earth Wind and Fire.

Kashif called to be one of the pioneers of the genre. His single "I Just Gotta Have You (Lover Turn Me On)" from the 1983 debut album Kashif helped to define the early 1980s boogie sound. Also such 1980s tracks like "Give Me the Night" (George Benson, 1980), "Boogie's Gonna Get Ya" (Rafael Cameron, 1981), "If You Want My Lovin'" (Evelyn King, 1981), "You're the One for Me" (D. Train, 1981), "Don't Make Me Wait" (Peech Boys, 1982) or "Break Dancin' – Electric Boogie" (West Street Mob, 1984) helped define the musical style of boogie.

Throughout the 1980s, various New York City-based boogie groups began experimenting with the dub-infused bass which anticipated the sounds of house. One of these groups was Peech Boys, followed by D. Train, Vicky D, and Sharon Redd. While some record producers, such as François Kevorkian  and Larry Levan, were polishing and extending the limits of urban-oriented boogie, others like Arthur Baker and John "Jellybean" Benitez drew their influences from European and Japanese technopop music. The latter approach paved the way for electro, and subsequently, freestyle music.

Boogie had a popular following within London's underground scene, often based around nightclubs and club DJs due to a lack of mainstream radio support. Boogie records were mostly imported from the U.S. and were sometimes labeled as "electro-funk" or "disco-funk."

2010s: revitalization

Much later in the 2000s and early 2010s, indietronica groups and artists such as James Pants, Juice Aleem, Sa-Ra Creative Partners had been influenced by the sounds of boogie and 1980s electronic music in general. Chromeo, a Canadian duo, published a boogie-oriented album called She's in Control in 2004. Dâm-Funk, another boogie-influenced artist hailing from Los Angeles, California, published an album Toeachizown in 2009.

During the mid to late 2010s, boogie was part of the nu-disco and future funk renaissance, the former a primarily European artists-led EDM phenomenon, fusing French house with American 1970s disco and 1980s boogie, and 1980s European electronic dance music styles, the latter connected to the vaporwave scene. Bruno Mars ("Uptown Funk") was one of the more mainstream 2010s artists influenced by boogie.

Electro

Among electro-boogie (later shortened to electro) pioneers include Zapp, D. Train, Sinnamon and other post-disco/boogie musicians; especially those influenced by new wave and synthpop acts like Human League or Gary Numan, combined with the R&B sound of Herbie Hancock and George Clinton. As the electronic progression continued, acoustic instruments such as bass guitar were replaced by Japanese-made synthesizers and most notably by iconic drum machines like Roland TR-808. Early uses of this drum machine include several Yellow Magic Orchestra tracks in 1980–1981, the 1982 track "Planet Rock" by Afrikaa Bambaataa, and the 1982 song "Sexual Healing" by Marvin Gaye.

About electro origins, Greg Wilson argues:

Notes

References

 
20th-century music genres
1980s in music
2000s in music
2010s in music
American styles of music
Post-disco
Rhythm and blues music genres